Lubliniec railway station is a railway station in Lubliniec, Silesian Voivodeship, Poland. As of 2022, it is served by Polregio (local and InterRegio services) and PKP Intercity (EIP, InterCity, and TLK services).

Train services

The station is served by the following services:

Express Intercity Premium services (EIP) Warsaw - Wrocław
Express Intercity services (EIC) Warsaw - Wrocław 

Intercity services (IC) Warszawa  - Częstochowa - Opole - Wrocław 
Intercity services (IC) Białystok - Warszawa - Częstochowa - Opole - Wrocław
Intercity services (TLK) Warszawa - Częstochowa - Lubliniec - Opole - Wrocław - Szklarska Poręba Górna

Regional Service (PR) Częstochowa – Lubliniec
Regional Service (PR) Częstochowa – Lubliniec - Kluczbork - Namysłów
Regional Service (PR) Wrocław - Oleśnica - Kluczbork - Lubliniec 
Regional Service (PR) Lubliniec - Tarnowskie Góry

Regional Service (KŚ)  Lubliniec - Tarnowskie Góry - Bytom - Katowice
Regional Service (KŚ)  Częstochowa – Lubliniec

References 

Station article at koleo.pl

Railway stations in Silesian Voivodeship
Railway stations served by Przewozy Regionalne InterRegio